Rimane is a surname. Notable people with the name include:

 Davy Rimane (born 1979), member of the National Assembly of France for French Guiana's 2nd constituency (2022–present)
 Juliana Rimane (born 1959), former member of the National Assembly of France for French Guiana's 2nd constituency (2002–2007)
 Kévin Rimane (born 1991), French Guianan professional footballer